Thenthuk or hand-pulled noodle soup (thukpa), is a very common noodle soup in Tibetan cuisine, especially in Amdo, Tibet where it is served as dinner and sometimes lunch. The main ingredients are wheat flour dough, mixed vegetables and some pieces of mutton or yak meat. Vegetable thenthuk is a common modern day option too.

Preparation
Making the soup consists of mixing the flour, kneading the dough, chopping the vegetables and meat and boiling the soup.

The cook starts working with the dough when everything boiling in the soup is well cooked. They shape the dough, flatten it, pull it and cut it off, right into the boiling soup. As soon as this is finished, the noodle soup is ready to cool down and be served.

Nepalese thukpa
The Nepalese version of thukpa contains chili powder, masalas, and noodles with gram and pea soup which gives it a hot and spicy flavor. The most typical Nepali thukpa is found in Sankhuwasabha district. However, the thukpa found in Kathmandu Valley is the same as that found in Tibet due to immigrant Tibetan refugees.

See also
 List of soups
 List of Tibetan dishes

References

Tibetan cuisine
Nepalese cuisine
Noodle soups